St Anne's Catholic School is an 11-18 secondary school in Southampton, England, for girls. The school's sixth form is coeducational. The school is situated close to the city centre, and attracts pupils from all round the city and beyond. The school converted to academy status in August 2012. In January 2016, there were 1080 students enrolled, with 48 students at the end of Year 13. Until 2006, it was known as St Anne's Convent School.

History
St Anne's Convent School was established in 1904 by the La Sainte Union Sisters and is still under their trusteeship. 

Girls from this school joined Talbot Heath School in Bournemouth during WW2 as they were moved to safety. That school was open throughout the war.<

St Anne's was the first direct grant grammar school to convert to a comprehensive intake. After over a century of single-sex education, boys were admitted into the sixth form for the first time beginning in the 2006-07 school year. The word "convent" was dropped from the school's official title to reflect this change.

Premises
The school occupies a site on the corner of Carlton Road and Carlton Crescent back to Rockstone Place. Nos. 11 and 12 Carlton Crescent are Grade II listed buildings. The westwards extension of No. 12 was built in 1961, for which the architects, Richard Sheppard, Robson & Partners, received a Civic Trust design award; this was described as "a model of neighbourly treatment in terms of scale character and materials, and an outstanding example of a modern building meeting present-day requirements yet harmonising beautifully with an earlier style".

Academics
The school annually achieves significantly better than the national average. The progress students make from starting at age 11 places it in the top 10% of schools nationally. The school's 5A*-C indicator has been in the 70-80% range for the past four years. It achieved an English Baccalaureate result of 47% in 2015. It regularly ranks at the top of the A Levels results table for non-independent schools in Hampshire.

Ofsted inspection reports
The school was last inspected by Ofsted in March 2016. The inspection team rated the overall effectiveness of the school as Outstanding in all areas, including the sixth form.

References

External links
 The school's website
 The school on Ofsted's website

 

Girls' schools in Hampshire
Catholic secondary schools in the Diocese of Portsmouth
Secondary schools in Southampton
Academies in Southampton
Recipients of Civic Trust Awards
1904 establishments in England
Educational institutions established in 1904